The 2015 season is Grêmio Foot-Ball Porto Alegrense's 112th season in existence and the club's 10th consecutive season in the top division of Brazilian football. At this season, Grêmio participate in the Campeonato Brasileiro Série A, the Copa do Brasil and the Campeonato Gaúcho.

Season overview

Pre-season
At the end of the 2014 Grêmio F.B.P.A. season, without qualify for the 2015 Copa Libertadores de América, the new board of directors of the Grêmio, with the president Romildo Bolzan Jr., decided to reduce the monthly payroll of the club from €2.2 million to €1.5 million. For the season, with the reduction of the monthly payroll, the Grêmio decided to invest in its academy, using in their pre-season more than 10 players of youth squads. With it, the Grêmio did not exercise the option of purchase of two players who were with loans to a close, and Alan Ruiz and Dudu returned to their respective clubs. Also, the contract of Zé Roberto was not renewed, leaving him free to sign with another club, which ended up being Palmeiras. Pará also left the club on season-long loan, moving to Flamengo as payment of a debt that the Grêmio had with the Carioca club since 2000 because of a Rodrigo Mendes transfer.

With the end of the 2014 season, the Grêmio received as a loan return almost 20 players, seeing that the vast majority began to train separately from the First team squad waiting for a new loans. The young goalkeeper Jakson Follmann was loaned to Linense to gain experience in a half-season deal. Rodrigo Sabiá, which is not part of the club's plans, was again loaned, this time to Paulista also in a half-season contract. The midfielder Guilherme Biteco goes definitively to 1899 Hoffenheim after having been selling to the club in October 2012, but followed at Grêmio on loan until then.

On 17 December, the Grêmio announced its largest purchase for the season, the playmaker Douglas, acquiring in a free transfer from Corinthians, signing a contract until the end of the season. Also on the 17th was announced the departure of Mateus Magro to Aparecidense, who was with his contract with Grêmio ending. Two days later, announced the signing of polyvalent player Marcelo Oliveira, signed from 2014 Campeonato Brasileiro Série A champions Cruzeiro, also in the free transfer deal, signing a contract until December 2016.

As well as Follmann, the club also loaned Bressan to Flamengo, however, in a season-long deal. The club also renewed the contract of Cristian Riveros, which would end in mid-2015, but did not reveal the new term. It was also announced that Saimon, Léo Gago and Marco Antônio will not have their contracts renewed, thus being free to sign with another club. Also did not have his contract renewed the goalkeeper Gustavo Busatto, who went to América-RN. Already Bergson, who had returned from loan, confirmed a new loan deal, this time to a K League club side, which yet has not been disclosed.

On Christmas Eve, the club announced its latest deal in 2014, revealing the purchase of Pedro Geromel for an undisclosed amount from FC Köln until December 2017. Until then, he was on loan until the mid of 2016, which may leave the club if a purchase proposal was offered to the German club by another team. On the same day, the executive of football Rui Costa confirmed that the Grêmio has no more interest in Edinho and he did not participate in the 2015 season.

On the first working day of 2015, were announced two loans until the end of the season. Tony confirmed his departure to Bahia and Douglas Grolli will pass another season playing at the Chapecoense. On 5 January, another season-long loan deal was announced, this time with the forward Fernandinho going to Serie A club Hellas Verona. On the same day, it was also announced the half-season loan of Maxi Rodríguez to Universidad de Chile, to compete in the Copa Libertadores de América. On day 6, it was announced that Bergson was loaned to Busan IPark.

Club

Staff

Board members
 President: Romildo Bolzan Jr.
 Vice-president: Adalberto Preis
 Vice-president: Antônio Dutra Júnior
 Vice-president: Cláudio Oderich
 Vice-president: Marcos Herrmann
 Vice-president: Odorico Roman
 Vice-president: Sergei Costa
 Chief Executive Officer: Gustavo Zanchi
 Director of football: César Pacheco
 Executive of football: Rui Costa
 Superintendent: Antônio Carlos Verardi
 Supervisor of football: Marcelo Rudolph

Coaching staff
 Head coach: Luiz Felipe Scolari (until 19 May) / Roger Machado (from 26 May)
 Assistant coach: Flávio Murtosa (until 19 May) / Roberto Ribas (from 26 May)
 Assistant coach: Ivo Wortmann (until 19 May) / James Freitas (from 26 May)
 Fitness coach: Darlan Schneider (until 19 May) / Rogério Dias (from 26 May)
 Assistant fitness coach: Rogério Dias (until 19 May)
 Assistant fitness coach: Mário Pereira
 Goalkeeper coach: Rogério Godoy
 Performance analyst: Eduardo Cecconi
 Performance analyst: Antônio Cruz

Medical staff
 Head doctor: Saul Berdichevski
 Assistant head doctor: Fábio Krebs
 Doctor: Márcio Bolzoni
 Doctor: Felipe do Canto
 Doctor: Paulo Rabaldo
 Doctor: Márcio Dornelles
 Physiologist: José Leandro
 Physiologist: Rafael Gobbato
 Physiotherapist: Henrique Valente
 Physiotherapist: Felipe Marques
 Massagist: Marco Zeilmann
 Massagist: José Flores
 Massagist: Anderson Meurer
 Nurse: Adriano Welter
 Nutritionist: Katiuce Borges

Other staff
 Press officer: João Paulo Fontoura
 Cameraman: Juares Dagort
 Equipment manager: Marco Severino
 Equipment manager: Danilo Bueno
 Assistant equipment manager: Antônio Marcos
 Butler: Paulo Oliveira
 Chief security: Luiz Fernando Cardoso
 Security: Cristiano Nunes
 Security: Pedro Carvalho
 Security: André Trisch
 Caretaker: Moacir da Luz
 Motorist: Valdeci Coelho
Last updated: 4 October 2015.Source: Grêmio Foot-Ball Porto Alegrense

Kit
Supplier: Umbro
Sponsor(s): Banrisul / TIM / Unimed / Tramontina

This is the first season that Umbro supplies kits for Grêmio, after three years of partnership with Topper. The agreement has a duration of four years, that is, until the end of the 2018 season. The presentation of the complete collection for this season took place in on 8 January, at 20:30 UTC−02:00, in Arena do Grêmio. With the slogan "Heart & Soul", the Umbro-based the collection in the Grêmio's tradition, keeping the pattern already known and identified with the club.

Squad information

First team squad
Players and informations last updated on 4 October 2015.Note: Flags indicate national team as has been defined under FIFA eligibility rules. Players may hold more than one non-FIFA nationality.

Starting XI
4–2–3–1 Formation

According to the most recent line-ups, not most used players (in Notes).

Transfers and loans

Transfers in

Loans in

Transfers out

Loans out

Overall transfer activity

Spending

Transfer:  €0

Loan:  €0

Total:  €0

Income

Transfer:  €0

Loan:  €0

Total:  €0

Expenditure

Transfer:  €0

Loan:  €0

Total:  €0

Friendlies

Pre-season

Competitions

Overall

Campeonato Gaúcho

Results summary

First stage

League table

Results by matchday

Matches

Knockout phase

Quarter-finals

Semi-finals

Finals

Campeonato Brasileiro

League table

Results summary

Results by matchday

Matches

Copa do Brasil

Matches

First round

Second round

Third round

Statistics

Appearances and goals

|-
! colspan="14" style="background:#E6E8FA; text-align:center"|Goalkeepers

|-
! colspan="14" style="background:#E6E8FA; text-align:center"|Defenders

|-
! colspan="14" style="background:#E6E8FA; text-align:center"|Midfielders

|-
! colspan="14" style="background:#E6E8FA; text-align:center"|Forwards

|-
! colspan="14" style="background:#E6E8FA; text-align:center"|Players who currently don't integrate the squad

Goalscorers
The list include all goals in competitive matches.

As of 24 May 2015.Source: Match reports in Competitions

Clean sheets

As of 24 May 2015.Source: Match reports in Competitions

Overview
{|class="wikitable" style="font-size:90%"
|-
|Games played        || 26 (3 Campeonato Brasileiro, 3 Copa do Brasil, 20 Campeonato Gaúcho)
|-
|Games won           || 15 (1 Campeonato Brasileiro, 3 Copa do Brasil, 11 Campeonato Gaúcho)
|-
|Games drawn         || 6 (1 Campeonato Brasileiro, 5 Campeonato Gaúcho)
|-
|Games lost          || 5 (1 Campeonato Brasileiro, 4 Campeonato Gaúcho)
|-
|Goals scored        || 36
|-
|Goals conceded      || 18
|-
|Goal difference     || +18
|-
|Clean sheets        || 13
|-
|Best result         || 3–0 (H) v União Frederiquense – Campeonato Gaúcho – 31 January
|-
|Worst result        || 2–0 (A) v Coritiba – Campeonato Brasileiro – 16 May
|-
|Top scorer          || Luan (6)
|-

Home attendances
Below listed are the top ten home attendances of Grêmio in matches at this season.

{| class="wikitable sortable" style="text-align:center; font-size:90%"
|-
!width=45 class="unsortable"| Pos.
!width=150 class="unsortable"| Competition
!width=130 class="unsortable"| Round / Matchday
!width=100 class="unsortable"| Date
!width=55 class="unsortable"| Score
!width=140 class="unsortable"| Opponent
!width=92 class="unsortable"| Attendance
|-
|1||Campeonato Gaúcho||Finals||26 April||bgcolor="#FFFFCC"|0–0||Internacional ||46,909
|-
|2||Campeonato Gaúcho||Semi-finals||18 April||bgcolor="#CCFFCC"|2–1||Juventude ||32,855
|-
|3||Campeonato Gaúcho||First stage||14 March||bgcolor="#CCFFCC"|1–0||Cruzeiro-RS ||24,894
|-
|4||Campeonato Gaúcho||First stage||7 March||bgcolor="#CCFFCC"|3–1||Caxias ||23,055
|-
|5||Campeonato Gaúcho||First stage||22 March||bgcolor="#CCFFCC"|2–0||Lajeadense ||20,134
|-
|6||Campeonato Gaúcho||First stage||31 January||bgcolor="#CCFFCC"|2–0||União Frederiquense ||19,873
|-
|7||Campeonato Gaúcho||Quarter-finals||9 April||bgcolor="#FFFFCC"|1–1||Novo Hamburgo ||16,991
|-
|8||Campeonato Gaúcho||First stage||29 March||bgcolor="#CCFFCC"|2–0||São Paulo-RS ||16,055
|-
|9||Campeonato Gaúcho||First stage||11 February||bgcolor="#FFCCCC"|0–1||Brasil (PE) ||15,153
|-
|10||Campeonato Gaúcho||First stage||23 February||bgcolor="#FFFFCC"|0–0||Juventude ||14,672
|-

Correct as of match played 10 May 2015.

References

2015 Season
Brazilian football clubs 2015 season